Eli Fearn Turner (1893–1937) was an English footballer who played in the Football League for Crewe Alexandra. Turner guested for Stoke during World War I.

Career statistics
Source:

References

1893 births
1937 deaths
English footballers
Association football midfielders
English Football League players
Crewe Alexandra F.C. players
Oswestry Town F.C. players
Runcorn F.C. Halton players
Stoke City F.C. wartime guest players